Christ the Redeemer Church may refer to:

 Christ the Redeemer Church (Valletta, Malta), a Franciscan Catholic church.
 Christ the Redeemer Church (Spokane, Washington), an independent evangelical Protestant church

See also
 Christ the Redeemer (disambiguation)